The following is a list of current regiments of the Australian Army, listed by Corps and service type.

Armour

Regular Army
1st Armoured Regiment 
 2nd Cavalry Regiment
2nd/14th Light Horse Regiment(Queensland Mounted Infantry)
12th/16th Hunter River Lancers
1st/15th Royal New South Wales Lancers 
4th/19th Prince of Wales's Light Horse
3rd/9th Light Horse (South Australian Mounted Rifles) 
10th Light Horse Regiment

Artillery

Regular Army
1st Regiment, Royal Australian Artillery
4th Regiment, Royal Australian Artillery
8th/12th Regiment, Royal Australian Artillery
16th Regiment, Royal Australian Artillery
20th Regiment, Royal Australian Artillery

Army Reserve
9th Regiment, Royal Australian Artillery

Aviation
 1st Aviation Regiment
 5th Aviation Regiment
 6th Aviation Regiment

Engineers

Regular Army
 1st Combat Engineer Regiment 
 2nd Combat Engineer Regiment
 3rd Combat Engineer Regiment
 6th Engineer Support Regiment

Army Reserve
 5th Engineer Regiment
 11th Engineer Regiment
 22nd Engineer Regiment

Special Forces
Special Operations Engineer Regiment

Infantry

Army Reserve
Royal Queensland Regiment
Royal New South Wales Regiment
Royal Victoria Regiment
Royal South Australia Regiment
Royal Western Australia Regiment
Royal Tasmania Regiment

Regular Army
Royal Australian Regiment

Regional Force Surveillance
NORFORCE
Pilbara Regiment
Far North Queensland Regiment

Special Forces
Special Air Service Regiment
1st Commando Regiment
2nd Commando Regiment

Signals
 1st Signals Regiment
 1st Combat Signals Regiment
 3rd Combat Signals Regiment
 7th Combat Signals Regiment
 7th Signals Regiment
 8th Signals Regiment

Reserve training
Sydney University Regiment
Melbourne University Regiment
Queensland University Regiment
Adelaide Universities Regiment
Western Australia University Regiment
University of New South Wales Regiment

See also
Structure of the Australian Army
List of Australian Army Corps

Regiments